The Esperanto language has a dedicated braille alphabet. One Esperanto braille magazine, Esperanta Ligilo, has been published since 1904, and another, Aŭroro, since 1920.

Alphabet
The basic braille alphabet is extended for the print letters with diacritics.  The circumflex is marked by adding dot 6 (lower right) to the base letter:  ĉ,  ĝ,  ĥ,  ĵ,  ŝ. Therefore, the letter ĵ has the same form as the unused French/English Braille letter  w; to write a w in a foreign name, dot 3 is added:  w  (see next section). Esperanto ŭ is made by reflecting u, so that dot 1 becomes dot 4:  ŭ. 
The alphabet is thus as follows.

Contracted braille is in limited use.

Transcribing foreign letters
Beside the basic-Latin foreign letters q, w, x, y, there are dedicated letters for the umlauted vowels that occur in print German, ä, ö, ü:

Additional accented letters in other languages are handled by separate braille cells for the diacritics.  These do not have a one-to-one correspondence with print:

These conventions are used for foreign names adapted to Esperanto Braille.  Unassimilated text in another braille alphabet is indicated by the code .

Punctuation

Single punctuation

The apostrophe and abbreviation point are both transcribed , which is distinct from the period/stop, .

Paired punctuation

Quotation marks in print Esperanto are highly variable, and tend to follow the conventions of the country a text is published in.  This is irrelevant for printing in braille.

Numbers
The apostrophe/abbreviation point  is used to group digits within numbers, like the comma in English.  In both print and braille Esperanto, the comma is used as the decimal mark, so:
 print English 100,000.00 
= print Esperanto 100 000,00 
= braille .

Formatting
Capitals are only marked for proper names.  They are not used at the beginning of a sentence.

For emphasis (bold or italics in print), a simple  is used to mark each of one to three words. For longer emphatic text, there are two formats: Either a colon precedes the simple emphatic sign, and an additional sign  is placed before the last emphasized word, or the sign  is placed before and after the emphasized text.

In contracted (grade 2) braille, a different sign is used for capital letters,  (dot 6).  As in most braille orthographies, proper names are not contracted, and words preceded by this sign are not contracted in Esperanto Braille.

References

External links
Ligo internacia de blindaj esperantistoj

French-ordered braille alphabets
Esperanto